

Events

January–March
 January 1
 Japan adopts the Gregorian calendar.
 The California Penal Code goes into effect.
 January 17 – American Indian Wars: Modoc War: First Battle of the Stronghold – Modoc Indians defeat the United States Army.
 February 11 – The Spanish Cortes deposes King Amadeus I, and proclaims the First Spanish Republic.
 February 12 
 Emilio Castelar, the former foreign minister, becomes prime minister of the new Spanish Republic.
 The Coinage Act of 1873 in the United States is signed into law by President Ulysses S. Grant; coming into effect on April 1, it ends bimetallism in the U.S., and places the country on the gold standard.
 February 20
 The University of California opens its first medical school in San Francisco.
 British naval officer John Moresby discovers the site of Port Moresby in Papua New Guinea, and claims the land for Britain.
 March 3 – Censorship: The United States Congress enacts the Comstock Law, making it illegal to send any "obscene, lewd, or lascivious" books through the mail.
 March 4 –  Ulysses S. Grant is sworn in for a second term as President of the United States.
 March 15 – The Phi Sigma Kappa student fraternity is founded at the Massachusetts Agricultural College.
 March 22 – Emancipation Day for Puerto Rico: Most slaves are freed.
 March 26 – First Aceh Expedition: A Dutch military expedition is launched to bombard Banda Aceh, capital of the Aceh Sultanate (in modern-day Indonesia), beginning the Aceh War.
 March 29 – The Rio Tinto Company is formed in Spain, following the February 17 purchase of the Rio Tinto Mine from the Spanish government by a British investment group.

April–June
 April 1 – British ocean liner  sinks off Nova Scotia, killing 547.
 April 4 – The Kennel Club, the world's first kennel club, is founded in the United Kingdom.
 April 15–17 – American Indian Wars: The Second Battle of the Stronghold is fought.
 April 19 – In Richmond, Rhode Island, 11 people perish in a train derailment, due to a bridge washout in the village of Richmond Switch (modern-day Wood River Junction). 
 May – Henry Rose exhibits barbed wire at an Illinois county fair, which is taken up by Joseph Glidden and Jacob Haish, who invent a machine to mass-produce it.
 May 1–October 31 – 1873 Vienna World's Fair in the Prater.
 May 5 – Third Carlist War in Spain: Battle of Eraul – Carlists under General Dorregaray defeat Republicans at Eraul, near Estella.
 May 9
 Der Gründerkrach: The Wiener Börse (Vienna stock exchange) crash in Austria-Hungary ends the Gründerzeit, and heralds the global Panic of 1873 and Long Depression.
 Third Carlist War: The Battle of Montejurra is fought at Navarra, Spain.
 May 20
 Levi Strauss and Jacob Davis receive United States patent#139121, for using copper rivets to strengthen the pockets of denim work pants. Levi Strauss & Co. begins manufacturing the famous Levi's brand of jeans, using fabric from the Amoskeag Manufacturing Company in Manchester, New Hampshire.
 In Chipping Norton, England, rioters attempt to free the Ascott Martyrs –16 women sentenced to imprisonment, for attempting to dissuade strikebreakers in an agricultural labor dispute.
 May 23
 The Canadian Parliament establishes the North-West Mounted Police (which is renamed the Royal Canadian Mounted Police in 1920).
 The Preakness Stakes horse race is run for the first time in Baltimore.
 May 27 – Classical archaeologist Heinrich Schliemann discovers Priam's Treasure.
 May 28
 C. Laan brings order to the chaos created by the dockworker riots of Tripoli, Lebanon.
 The city of Khiva in Uzbekistan falls to Imperial Russian forces, under the command of General Konstantin von Kaufman.
 June
 Britain puts pressure on Sultan Sayyid Barghash bin Said of Zanzibar to enforce closure of the slave market in Zanzibar.
 Ochanomizu Women's University founded in Japan (as Tokyo Women's Normal School).
 June 4 – American Indian Wars: The Modoc War ends with the capture of Kintpuash (Captain Jack).
 June 9 – Alexandra Palace entertainment venue in London is destroyed by fire, only a fortnight after its opening.

July–September
 July – The end of the war between the United Kingdom and Ghana's King Kofi KariKari, who is involved in the trading of slaves, leads to the establishment of the Gold Coast Colony.
 July 1 – Prince Edward Island joins the Canadian Confederation.
 July 5 – New Rush in Griqualand West, South Africa, is renamed Kimberley.
 July 9 – Third Carlist War: Battle of Alpens – Campaigning in Catalonia, a government column under General José Cabrinetty is ambushed at Alpens, 15 miles east of Berga, by Carlist forces under General Francisco Savalls. After heavy fighting, with Cabrinety killed, virtually the entire column of 800 men is killed or captured.
 July 17 – Richard Southey becomes the first Lieutenant-Governor of Griqualand West.
 July 21 – At Adair, Iowa, Jesse James and the James–Younger Gang pull off the first successful train robbery in the American Old West (US$3,000 from the Rock Island Express).
 July 22 – Sir Benjamin Pine becomes Lieutenant-governor of the Colony of Natal.
 August 4 – American Indian Wars: While protecting a railroad survey party in Montana, the Seventh Cavalry, under Lieutenant Colonel George Armstrong Custer, clashes for the first time with the Sioux, near the Tongue River (only 1 man on each side is killed).
 August 12 – A peace treaty is signed between Imperial Russia and the Khanate of Khiva, making the khanate a Russian protectorate.
 August 30 – The Austro-Hungarian North Pole Expedition discovers Franz Josef Land.
 September 15 – The International Meteorological Organization (IMO) is established.
 September 16 – German troops leave France upon completion of payment of indemnity for the Franco-Prussian War.
 September 17 – The Ohio Agricultural and Mechanical College, later Ohio State University, opens its doors with 25 students, including 2 women.
 September 18 – A New York stock market crash helps to trigger the Panic of 1873, part of the Long Depression.
 September 25 – Classes begin at Drury University in Springfield, Missouri.

October–December
 October – The Long Depression begins in the United States.
 October 6
 Third Carlist War: Battle of Mañeru – In continued campaigning in Navarre, Spanish Republican General Domingo Moriones meets a Carlist force under Nicolás Ollo at Mañeru, near Puente de la Reina, in a hard-fought but indecisive action. While both sides claim victory, the Carlists are said to have had the advantage, and a month later Moriones is repulsed in a costly assault further west, against Estella.
 The County Carlow Football Club (rugby union) is founded in Ireland.
 November 6 – The Halifax Rugby League Club is founded in the north of England.
 November 7
 Alexander Mackenzie becomes the second Prime Minister of Canada.
 Third Carlist War: Battle of Montejurra – Determined to recapture the key city of Estella in Navarre, Spanish Republican General Domingo Moriones advances on the Carlists under General Joaquín Elío at nearby Montejurra. After very heavy fighting both sides claim victory, but Moriones withdraws, and Estella remains in Carlist hands. Don Carlos is present in the front line.
 November 10 – Establishment of the Home Ministry in Japan, introducing police services of the Empire of Japan on the European model.
 November 17 – Budapest, Hungary's capital, is formed from Pest, Buda and Óbuda.
 November 18–21 – Irish Home Rule movement: The Home Government Association reconstitutes itself as the Home Rule League.
 November 22 – , on passage from New York to France, collides with Scottish 3-masted iron clipper Loch Earn in mid-Atlantic and sinks in 12 minutes with the loss of 226 lives.
 December –  Major Walter Clopton Wingfield designs and patents a racquet sport, which he calls sphairistike (Greek σφάίρίστική, "skill at playing at ball"), soon known simply as Stické and an ancestor of lawn tennis, for the amusement of his guests at a garden party on his estate of Nantclwyd, in Llanelidan, Wales.
 December 15 – Women of Fredonia, New York, march against the retail liquor dealers in town, to inaugurate the Woman's Crusade of 1873–74.
 December 16 – The Heineken Brewery is founded in Amsterdam, the Netherlands.
 December 19 (December 7 OS) – Pyotr Ilyich Tchaikovsky's fantasia The Tempest, composed between August and October, is premiered, in Moscow.
 December 21 – French official Francis Garnier is attacked outside Hanoi by Black Flag mercenaries fighting for the Vietnamese.
 December 22 – Third Carlist War: Battle of Bocairente – Campaigning in Valenica, Spanish Republican General Valeriano Weyler is attacked at Bocairente, northwest of Alcoy, by a greatly superior Carlist force under General José Santés. Weyler is initially driven back, losing some of his guns, but in a brilliant counter-attack he turns defeat into victory, and Santés is heavily repulsed and forced to withdraw.
 December 23 – The Woman's Christian Temperance Union is founded, in Hillsboro, Ohio.
 December 27 – Third Carlist War: Siege of Bilbao (until 2 May 1874) – Campaigning in Navarre, Pretender Don Carlos VII and General Joaquín Elío besiege Bilbao, held by General Ignacio del Castillo and 1,200 men. The Carlist force is ten times this number, and includes most of the troops from Navarre, Vizcaya and Álava, although a considerable force is left in Guipúzcoa. Despite defeat at nearby Somorrostro, Republican commander Marshal Francisco Serrano, supported by Generals Manuel de la Concha and Arsenio Martínez-Campos, brilliantly breaks the siege, and Concha then marches on Estella.

Date unknown
 The League of the Three Emperors is created. It links the conservative monarchs of Austria-Hungary, the German Empire and the Russian Empire in an alliance against radical movements.
 Founding in Canada of:
 Toronto Argonauts (football), the oldest professional sports team still playing in North America.
 Royal Montreal Club in Montreal, the first permanent golf club in North America.
 Liebig's Extract of Meat Company begins producing tinned corned beef, sold under the label Fray Bentos, from the town in Uruguay where it is processed.
 Coors Brewing Company begins making beer in Golden, Colorado.
 Konishiya Rokubei, predecessor of the Konica Minolta worldwide imaging brand, is founded in Tokyo, Japan.
 The Swedish arms company Aktiebolaget (AB) Bofors-Gullspång, better known as Bofors, is founded.
 In Mexico, the Veracruz–Mexico City railroad is completed.
 Nine Pekin ducks are imported to Long Island (the first in the United States).
 The Married Woman's Property Rights Association is founded in Sweden.

Births

January–March
 

 

 January 2 – Thérèse of Lisieux, Catholic saint, mystic (d. 1897)
 January 4 – Blanche Walsh, American stage, screen actress (d. 1915)
 January 7 – Adolph Zukor, Austrian-born film studio pioneer (d. 1976)
 January 8 – Iuliu Maniu, Romanian politician (d. 1953)
 January 9 
 Thomas Curtis, American athlete (d. 1944)
 Hayim Nahman Bialik, Israel's national poet (d. 1934)
 January 10 – George Orton, Canadian athlete (d. 1958)
 January 12 – Spyridon Louis, Greek runner (d. 1940)
 January 20 – Johannes V. Jensen, Danish writer, Nobel Prize laureate (d. 1950)
 January 28 – Colette, French writer (d. 1954)
 January 29 – Prince Luigi Amedeo, Duke of the Abruzzi, Italian mountaineer, explorer and admiral (d. 1933)
 January 30 – Vassily Balabanov, administrator, Provincial Governor of Imperial Russia (d. 1947)
 January 31 – Melitta Bentz, German entrepreneur who invented the coffee filter in 1908 (d. 1950)
 February 2 – Maurice Tourneur, French film director (d. 1961)
 February 3
 Hugh Trenchard, British military aviation pioneer (d. 1956)
 Karl Jatho, German aviation pioneer (d. 1933)
 February 4 – Étienne Desmarteau, Canadian athlete (d. 1905)
 February 7 – Thomas Andrews, Irish shipbuilder (d. 1912)
 February 13 
 Feodor Chaliapin, Russian bass opera singer (d. 1938)
 Red Wing, Native American silent film actress (d. 1974)
 February 15 – Hans von Euler-Chelpin, German-born chemist, Nobel Prize laureate (d. 1964)
 February 19 – Louis Feuillade, French film director (d. 1925)
 February 22 – Carrie Langston Hughes, African-American writer and actress (d. 1938)
 February 25 – Enrico Caruso, Italian tenor (d. 1921)
 February 28 – William McMaster Murdoch, Officer of Titanic (d. 1912)
 March 3 – William Green, American labor leader (d. 1952)
 March 11 – David Horsley, English-born film executive (d. 1933)
 March 19 –  Max Reger, German composer (d. 1916)
 March 29 – Billy Quirk, American actor (d. 1926)

April–June

 April 1 (N.S.)/March 20 (O.S.) – Sergei Rachmaninoff, Russian pianist and composer (d. 1943)
 April 4 – Gyula Peidl, 23rd prime minister of Hungary (d. 1943)
 April 7 –  John McGraw, American baseball player, manager (d. 1934)
 April 10 – Kyösti Kallio, Prime Minister and President of Finland (d. 1940)
 April 13 – John W. Davis, American politician, diplomat, and lawyer (d. 1955)
 April 19 – Sydney Barnes, English cricketer (d. 1967)
 April 20 – Gombojab Tsybikov, Russian explorer (d. 1930)
 April 22 – Ellen Glasgow, American writer (d. 1945)
 April 23 – Theodor Körner, President of Austria (d. 1957)
 April 25 
 Walter de la Mare, English poet, short story writer and novelist (d. 1956)
 Félix d'Herelle, French-Canadian microbiologist (d. 1949)
 May 4 – Joe De Grasse, Canadian film director (d. 1940)
 May 5 – Leon Czolgosz, assassin of U.S. President William McKinley (d. 1901)
 May 9 – Anton Cermak, Mayor of Chicago (d. 1933)
 May 10 – Cary D. Landis, American attorney and politician (d. 1938)
 May 15 – Oskari Tokoi, Finnish socialist and the Chairman of the Senate of Finland (d. 1963)
 May 17
 Henri Barbusse, French novelist, journalist (d. 1935)
 Dorothy Richardson, English feminist writer (d. 1957)
 May 21 – Hans Berger, German neurologist (d. 1941)
 May 28 – D. D. Sheehan, Irish politician (d. 1948)
 June 3 – Otto Loewi, German-born pharmacologist, recipient of the Nobel Prize in Physiology or Medicine (d. 1961)
 June 15 – Leonora Cohen, British suffragette and trade unionist (d. 1978)
 June 24 – Hugo Simberg, Finnish symbolist painter and graphic artist (d. 1917)
 June 28 – Alexis Carrel, French surgeon and biologist, recipient of the Nobel Prize in Physiology or Medicine (d. 1944)
 June 29 – Monroe Dunaway Anderson, Founder of Anderson, Clayton and Company; "Father of Texas Medical Center" (d. 1939)

July–September

 July 1
 Alice Guy-Blaché, French-American filmmaker (d. 1968)
 Andrass Samuelsen, 1st prime minister of Faroe Islands (d. 1954)
 July 3 – Prince Yamashina Kikumaro, Japanese prince (d. 1908)
 July 6 – Dimitrios Maximos, Prime Minister of Greece (d. 1955)
 July 8 – Carl Vaugoin, 7th Chancellor of Austria (d. 1949)
 July 12 – Oscar von Sydow, 18th prime minister of Sweden (d. 1936)
 July 20 – Alberto Santos-Dumont, Brazilian aviation pioneer (suicide) (d. 1932)
 July 22 – James Cousins, Irish writer (d. 1956)
 August 5 – Joseph Russell Knowland, American politician, newspaperman (d. 1966)
 August 10 – William Ernest Hocking, American philosopher (d. 1966)
 August 13
Cornelis Jacobus Langenhoven, South African author (d. 1932)
Christian Rakovsky, Bulgarian revolutionary, Russian Bolshevik and Soviet diplomat, journalist, physician, and essayist (executed) (d. 1941)
 August 17 – John A. Sampson, American gynecologist (d. 1946)
 August 18 – Otto Harbach, American lyricist (d. 1963)
 August 20 – William Henry Bell, 1st director of the South African College of Music (d. 1946)
 August 21 – Harry T. Morey, American actor (d. 1936)
 August 26 – Lee de Forest, American inventor (d. 1961)
 September 1
Sir Guy Standing, British actor (d. 1937)
 Felicija Bortkevičienė, Lithuanian politician and publisher  (d. 1945)
 September 5 – Cornelius Vanderbilt III, American military officer, inventor, engineer (d. 1942)
 September 8
Alfred Jarry, French author and playwright (d. 1907)
David O. McKay, 9th president of the Church of Jesus Christ of Latter-day Saints (d. 1970)
 September 17 – Ibrahim of Johor, Malaysian sultan (d. 1959)
 September 20
 Sidney Olcott, Canadian-born pioneer film director  (d. 1949)
 Ferenc Szisz, Hungarian-born racing driver (d. 1944)
 September 21 – Papa Jack Laine, American jazz musician (d. 1966)

October–December
 October 8 – Ma Barker, American criminal (d. 1935)
 October 9 – Karl Schwarzschild, German physicist, astronomer (d. 1916)
 October 13 – Georgios Kafantaris, Prime Minister of Greece (d. 1946)
 October 14 – Ray Ewry, American athlete (d. 1937)
 October 18 – Ivanoe Bonomi, 2-time prime minister of Italy (d. 1951)
 October 19
 Jaap Eden, Dutch skater, cyclist (d. 1925)
 Bart King, American cricketer (d. 1965)
 October 26
 Thorvald Stauning, 9th Prime Minister of Denmark (d. 1942)
 A. K. Fazlul Huq, Bengali statesman (d. 1962)
 October 30
Dave Gallaher, New Zealand rugby union football player (d. 1917)
Francisco I. Madero, 33rd president of Mexico (d. 1913)

 October 31 – Frederic Thompson, architect and showman, built Coney Islands Luna Park and the New York Hippodrome (d. 1919)
 November 9 – Fritz Thyssen, German industrialist (d. 1951)
 November 16 – W. C. Handy, American blues composer (d. 1958)
 November 20 – Ramón Castillo, Argentinian politician, 25th President of Argentina (d. 1944)
 November 22 – Johnny Tyldesley, English cricketer (d. 1930)
 November 28 – Frank Phillips, American oil executive (d. 1950)
 November 30 – William Boyle, British admiral (d. 1967)
 December 7 – Willa Cather, American novelist (d. 1947)
 December 11 – Josip Plemelj, Slovenian mathematician (d. 1967)
 December 17 – Ford Madox Ford, English writer (d. 1939)
 December 20 – Kan'ichi Asakawa, Japanese historian (d. 1948)
 December 26 – Thomas Wass, Nottinghamshire cricketer (d. 1953)
 December 30 – Al Smith,  American politician, Democratic presidential candidate (d. 1944)

Date unknown
 Nesaruddin Ahmad, Bengali Islamic scholar (d. 1952)
 Filip Mișea, Aromanian activist, physician and politician (d. 1944)

Deaths

January–June

 January 9 – Napoleon III, last Emperor of the French (b. 1808)
 January 18 – Edward Bulwer-Lytton, 1st Baron Lytton, English novelist (b. 1803)
 January 20 – Basil Moreau, French founder of the Congregation of Holy Cross (b. 1799)
 January 23 – Ramalinga Swamigal, Hindu religious leader (b. 1823)
 January 26 – Empress Amélie, consort of Pedro I of Brazil (b. 1812)
 February 3 – Isaac Baker Brown, English gynaecologist, surgeon (b. 1811)
 February 7 – Sheridan Le Fanu, Irish writer (b. 1814)
 February 18 – Vasil Levski, Bulgarian revolutionary (executed) (b. 1837)
 February 23 – Jakob von Hartmann, Bavarian general (b. 1795)
 March 10 – John Torrey, American botanist (b. 1796)
 March 24 – Mary Ann Cotton, English serial killer (executed) (b. 1832)
 March 25 – Wilhelm Marstrand, Danish painter (b. 1810)
 March 29 – Prince Unakan Ananta Norajaya Prince of Siam (b. 1856)
 March 31 
 Maria Magdalena Mathsdotter, Swedish Sámi educator (b. 1835)
 Hugh Maxwell, American lawyer, politician (b. 1787)
 April 11 
 Edward Canby, American general (b. 1817)
 Christopher Hansteen, Norwegian geophysicist (b. 1784)
 April 18 – Justus von Liebig, German chemist (b. 1803)
 April 27 – William Charles Macready, English actor (b. 1793)
 April 29 – Hortense Globensky-Prévost, Canadian heroine (b. 1804)
 May 1 – David Livingstone, Scottish explorer of Africa (b. 1813)
 May 5 – Jerónimo Carrión, 8th president of Ecuador (b. 1804)
 May 6 – José Antonio Páez, first president of Venezuela (b. 1790)
 May 7
 Salmon P. Chase, Chief Justice of the United States (b. 1808)
 John Stuart Mill, British philosopher (b. 1806)
 May 15 – Alexandru Ioan Cuza, first ruler of Romania (b. 1820)
 May 20 – George-Étienne Cartier, Canadian statesman (b. 1814)
 May 22 – Alessandro Manzoni, Italian poet and novelist (b. 1785)
 May 29 – Édouard de Verneuil, French palaeontologist (b. 1805)
 May 30 – Karamat Ali Jaunpuri, Indian Muslim scholar (b. 1800)
 June 1 – Joseph Howe, Canadian politician (b. 1804)

July–December

 August 18 – Charles II, Duke of Brunswick (b. 1804)
 September 8 – Johan Gabriel Ståhlberg, Finnish priest and father of K. J. Ståhlberg, the first President of Finland (b. 1832)
 September 11 – Agustín Fernando Muñoz, Duke of Riánsares, morganatic husband of Maria Christina of the Two Sicilies (b. 1808)
 September 17 – Alexander Berry, Scottish adventurer, Australian pioneer (b. 1781)
 September 22 – Friedrich Frey-Herosé, Swiss Federal Councilor (b. 1801)
 September 23 – Jean Chacornac, French astronomer (b. 1823)
 September 28 – Émile Gaboriau, French writer (b. 1833)
 October 5 – William Todd, American businessman, Canadian Senate nominee (b. 1803)
 October 9 – George Ormerod, English historian, antiquarian (b. 1785)
 October 17 – Sir Robert McClure, British Arctic explorer (b. 1807)
 December 14
 Louis Agassiz, Swiss-born geologist, naturalist (b. 1807)
 Alexander Keith, Scottish-born brewer, mayor of Halifax, Nova Scotia (b. 1795)

References

Further reading and year books
   1873 Annual Cyclopedia (1874) highly detailed coverage of "Political, Military, and Ecclesiastical Affairs; Public Documents; Biography, Statistics, Commerce, Finance, Literature, Science, Agriculture, and Mechanical Industry" for year 1873; massive compilation of facts and primary documents; worldwide coverage; 831pp